

Shweta is an Indian Hindu feminine given name. The Sanskrit word   literally means "white". The Hindu goddess of knowledge Saraswati is also known as "Shwetambara".

Notable people

Shweta 
 Shweta Bhardwaj (born 1985), Indian actress and model
 Shweta Chaudhary (born 1986), Indian shooter
 Shweta Gulati, Indian television actress
 Shweta Kawatra (born 1986), Indian actress
 Shweta Menon (born 1974), Indian actress and model
 Shweta Mohan (born 1986), Indian singer
 Shweta Munshi, Indian television actress
 Shweta Pandit (born 1986), Indian singer
 Shweta Prasad (born 1991), Indian film actress
 Shweta Rathore (born 1988), Indian bodybuilder
 Shweta Salve, Indian television actress and model
 Shweta Sekhon (born 1997), Malaysian model and beauty pageant titleholder
 Shweta Shetty (born 1969), Indian singer
 Shweta Subram, Indo-Canadian Bollywood playback singer
 Shweta Taneja, Indian novelist, graphic novelist and journalist
 Shweta Tiwari, Indian film and television actress
 Sweta Singh , Indian News reporter

Shwetha
 Shwetha Bandekar, actress in Tamil and Telugu cinema
 Shwetha Chengappa, actress in Kannada cinema
 P. Shwetha, actress in Tamil cinema
 Shwetha Srivatsav, actress in Kannada cinema

See also 
 Oxyopes shweta, a species of lynx spider
 Sweta, a genus of leafhopper in the subfamily Typhlocybinae
 Svetlana, a Slavic cognate

References 

Indian feminine given names